Krishna Murthy Puram is an urban commercial and residential suburb of Mysore city in Karnataka state, India.

Etymology
It was named after P. N. Krishnamurti, Diwan of Mysore Kingdom and grandson of Purnaiah, another Diwan. Krishnamurti is the only Dewan who has an extension named in his honour in Mysuru city.

Location
Krishnamurthypuram is located on the southern side of Mysore city between Saraswathipuram and Jayaprakash Nagar.

Mythri Institute
Mythri Institute runs a hostel for mentally challenged children.  It was established in 1982.  It was the first school of this type in Mysore.

Educational organisations
 Vanithasadhana School
 Aramane Padmaraja School
 Gokula School
 Gopalaswamy School
 C.T.I.College

Post office
Krishnamurthypuram is known as Mysore-4. There is a post office at Krishnamurthypuram and the pincode is 570004.

Economy
Krishnamurthypuram is a former residential colony now partially converted to a downtown area of Mysore.  There are many banks, shops and restaurants in this area.

Image gallery

References

Suburbs of Mysore
Mysore South